Low affinity immunoglobulin gamma Fc region receptor III-A is a protein that in humans is encoded by the FCGR3A gene. It is also known as CD16a as it is part of the cluster of differentiation cell surface molecules.

References

Further reading

External links 
 

Clusters of differentiation
Fc receptors